Hagrama Mohilary (born 1 March 1969) is an Indian politician who has served as the Chief Executive Member of the Bodoland Territorial Council. Mohilary was elected as the Chief of Executive Committee of the Bodoland Territorial Council which comprises thirteen other executive members. At present, he is the chairperson of the Bodoland People's Front, Mohilary had been the head of Bodoland Territorial Council since its inception in 2003. He won the third General Assembly Elections 2015 and formed his Government for the third time. Mohilary's third term expired on 27 April 2020 and following the postponement of elections scheduled for 4 April 2020 a result of the global coronavirus pandemic, Mohilary was the chief of the Bodo Liberation Tigers (BLT) before joining the mainstream politics in 2003.

After his party lost in 2020 BTC election and 2021 Assam election, Hagrama went to Nagpur and touched the feet of RSS leader for his party to stay relevant with the Hindutva ideology, caused political strom in Bodoland.

Early life
Mohilary was born in a Boro family on 1 March 1969.

Career

History 
Mohilary was the chief of the Bodo Liberation Tigers (BLT) before joining the mainstream politics in 2003. Mohilary formed Bodoland People's Front in year 2005 and elected as its first president. He formed an alliance with NDA, Atal Bihari Vajpayee become instrumental in onboarding Bodoland People's Front in 2003.

Bodoland Territorial Council
He played key role in establishment of Bodoland Territorial Council on 10 February 2003 thus fulfilling the Bodo aspirations. The Bodoland Territorial Council (BTC), self-governing body is a new name added to the provision of Sixth Schedule to the Constitution of India, in BTAD, Assam. Soon after taking over BTC as first Chief Executive Member, Mohilary advocated for quality education in BTC area. In 2010,the Bodoland People's Front (BPF) led by Mohilary swept the Bodoland Territorial Council (BTC) polls winning 31 of the 40 seats. He said that "I congratulate the people for the victory. Our victory has proved people's support to us. We will carry on the good work for the development of the region".

Assam Assembly election
Under his leadership Bodoland People's Front won 12 seats out of 13 contested seats in Assam Legislative Assembly held in 2016.

BTC Development

Agriculture Sector
As the Chief Executive Member of Bodoland Territorial Council, Mohilary planned various program for growth of agriculture sector, in January 2006 10 officers from four Districts of the BTC had been sent to Indian Institute of Horticulture Research (IIHR),Bangalore for the modern technologies.

Industrial Sector
BTC, setup 12 Handloom training Center and 6 handloom production centre. In the year 2008, the Bodoland Regional Apex Weavers ann Artisans Cooperative Federation Ltd. (BRAWFED) was formed by reorganising the BAHU (Bodoland Association of Handloom Unit) on Cooperative basis with registered Head Office at Kokrajhar in BTC, Assam.

Education
Bodoland University designated as 12B status university in 2019.BTC chief Hagrama Mohilary said the granting of 12B status to Bodoland University is a long-cherished dream of the people of the BTAD and the entire lower Assam coming true. Stating that Bodoland University is the only university in the BTC and the entire Lower Assam districts, Mohilary expressed his confidence that the university will pave the way for development of human resources, apart from other development and intellectual activities.

Development of Bodo Language
He was instrumental in the inclusion of Bodo language in Devanagari script in the Eighth Schedule to the Constitution of India as per Articles 344(1) and 351.

References

External links 
 rediff.com 2,641 militants surrender in Assam
 bodolandcouncil.org

1969 births
Living people
People from Kokrajhar district
Assam politicians
Bodo nationalism
Bodoland People's Front politicians